Azatadine/pseudoephedrine (Trinalin) is an antihistamine and decongestant formulation.  It is a combination drug containing azatadine maleate and pseudoephedrine sulfate.

References

	

Antihistamines
Combination drugs